Brera may refer to:

Places 
 Brera (district of Milan), Italy
 Biblioteca di Brera, a public library
 Palazzo Brera, a monumental palace
 Pinacoteca di Brera, a national art gallery in the Palazzo Brera, which also houses:
 Brera Academy, a public art college
 Brera Astronomical Observatory, observatory built in 1764
 Brera Madonna, a painting by Piero della Francesca
 Orto Botanico di Brera, a botanical garden

Names 
 Alfa Romeo Brera, a concept car presented in 2002 and a sports car produced between 2005 and 2010
 Brera Sterne, a Macross Frontier character
 Gianni Brera (1919–1992), Italian writer and journalist
 Paolo Brera (1949–2019), Italian writer and journalist

Other uses 
 Brera Calcio, a football club based in Milan